平安 is an East Asian name meaning "Flat tranquil" or "Peaceful".

平安 may refer to:
 Ping'an (disambiguation), the Chinese pinyin transliteration
 Heian (disambiguation), the Japanese transliteration
 Pyongan Province, former Korean province